Jalan Stesen Satelit Bumi Kuantan, Federal Route 423, is a federal road in Kuantan, Pahang, Malaysia.

At most sections, the Federal Route 423 was built under the JKR R5 road standard, with a speed limit of 90 km/h.

List of junctions

References

Malaysian Federal Roads